The U.S. state of West Virginia currently has two congressional districts, each represented by a member of the United States House of Representatives.

Current districts and representatives
List of members of the United States House delegation from West Virginia, district boundaries, and the district political ratings according to the CPVI. The delegation has a total of 2 members, both of whom are Republicans.

Historical and present district boundaries

Table of United States congressional district boundary maps in the State of West Virginia, presented chronologically. All redistricting events that took place in West Virginia between 1973 and 2013 are shown.

Obsolete districts

Third district 

The 3rd district was eliminated by the 2020 United States census.

Fourth district

The 4th district was eliminated by the 1990 United States census.

Fifth district

The 5th district was eliminated by the 1970 United States census.

Sixth district

The 6th district was eliminated by the 1960 United States census.

At-large district

West Virginia's at-large congressional district existed between 1913 and 1917, but it is now obsolete.

See also

List of United States congressional districts

References

External links
U.S. House of Representatives

Congressional districts of West Virginia